Jerome Klapka Jerome (2 May 1859 – 14 June 1927) was an English writer and humourist, best known for the comic travelogue Three Men in a Boat (1889). Other works include the essay collections Idle Thoughts of an Idle Fellow (1886) and Second Thoughts of an Idle Fellow; Three Men on the Bummel, a sequel to Three Men in a Boat; and several other novels. Jerome was born in Walsall, England, and, although he was able to attend grammar school, his family suffered from poverty at times, as did he as a young man trying to earn a living in various occupations. In his twenties, he was able to publish some work, and success followed. He married in 1888, and the honeymoon was spent on a boat on the Thames; he published Three Men in a Boat soon afterwards. He continued to write fiction, non-fiction and plays over the next few decades, though never with the same level of success.

Early life 

Jerome was born at Belsize House, 1 Caldmore Road, in Caldmore, Walsall, England. He was the fourth child of Marguerite Jones and Jerome Clapp (who later renamed himself Jerome Clapp Jerome), an ironmonger and lay preacher who dabbled in architecture. He had two sisters, Paulina and Blandina, and one brother, Milton, who died at an early age. Jerome was registered as Jerome Clapp Jerome, like his father's amended name, and the Klapka appears to be a later variation (after the exiled Hungarian general György Klapka). The family fell into poverty owing to bad investments in the local mining industry, and debt collectors visited often, an experience that Jerome described vividly in his autobiography My Life and Times (1926). At the age of two Jerome moved with his parents to Stourbridge, Worcestershire, then later to East London.

The young Jerome attended St Marylebone Grammar School. He wished to go into politics or be a man of letters, but the death of his father when Jerome was 13 and of his mother when he was 15 forced him to quit his studies and find work to support himself. He was employed at the London and North Western Railway, initially collecting coal that fell along the railway, and he remained there for four years.

Acting career and early literary works 

Jerome was inspired by his elder sister Blandina's love for the theatre, and he decided to try his hand at acting in 1877, under the stage name Harold Crichton. He joined a repertory troupe that produced plays on a shoestring budget, often drawing on the actors' own meagre resources – Jerome was penniless at the time – to purchase costumes and props. After three years on the road with no evident success, the 21-year-old Jerome decided that he had  enough of stage life and sought other occupations. He tried to become a journalist, writing essays, satires, and short stories, but most of these were rejected. Over the next few years, he was a school teacher, a packer, and a solicitor's clerk. Finally, in 1885, he had some success with On the Stage – and Off (1885), a comic memoir of his experiences with the acting troupe, followed by Idle Thoughts of an Idle Fellow (1886), a collection of humorous essays which had previously appeared in the newly founded magazine, Home Chimes, the same magazine that would later serialise Three Men in a Boat.

On 21 June 1888, Jerome married Georgina Elizabeth Henrietta Stanley Marris ("Ettie"), nine days after she divorced her first husband. She had a daughter from her previous five-year marriage nicknamed Elsie (her actual name was also Georgina). The honeymoon took place on the Thames "in a little boat," a fact that was to have a significant influence on his next and most important work, Three Men in a Boat.

Three Men in a Boat and later career 

Jerome sat down to write Three Men in a Boat as soon as the couple returned from their honeymoon. In the novel, his wife was replaced by his longtime friends George Wingrave (George) and Carl Hentschel (Harris). This allowed him to create comic (and non-sentimental) situations which were nonetheless intertwined with the history of the Thames region. The book, published in 1889, became an instant success and has never been out of print. Its popularity was such that the number of registered Thames boats went up fifty percent in the year following its publication, and it contributed significantly to the Thames becoming a tourist attraction. In its first twenty years alone, the book sold over a million copies worldwide. It has been adapted into films, TV, radio shows, stage plays, and even a musical. Its writing style has influenced many humourists and satirists in England and elsewhere.

With the financial security that the sales of the book provided, Jerome was able to dedicate all of his time to writing. He wrote a number of plays, essays, and novels, but was never able to recapture the success of Three Men in a Boat. In 1892, he was chosen by Robert Barr to edit The Idler (over Rudyard Kipling). The magazine was an illustrated satirical monthly catering to gentlemen (who, following the theme of the publication, appreciated idleness). In 1893, he founded To-Day, but had to withdraw from both publications because of financial difficulties and a libel suit.

Jerome's play Biarritz had a run of two months at the Prince of Wales Theatre between April and June 1896.

In 1898, a short stay in Germany inspired Three Men on the Bummel, the sequel to Three Men in a Boat, reintroducing the same characters in the setting of a foreign bicycle tour. The book was nonetheless unable quite to recapture the sheer comic energy and historic rootedness of its celebrated predecessor (lacking as it does the unifying thread that is the river Thames itself) and it has enjoyed only modest success by comparison. This said, some of the individual comic vignettes that make up "Bummel" are as fine as (or even finer than) those of "Boat".

In 1902, he published the novel Paul Kelver, which is widely regarded as autobiographical. His 1908 play The Passing of the Third Floor Back introduced a more sombre and religious Jerome. The main character was played by one of the leading actors of the time, Johnston Forbes-Robertson, and the play was a tremendous commercial success. It was twice made into film, in 1918 and in 1935.
However, the play was condemned by critics – Max Beerbohm described it as "vilely stupid" and as written by a "tenth-rate writer".

First World War and last years 

Jerome volunteered to serve his country at the outbreak of the First World War but being 55 years old, he was rejected by the British Army. Eager to serve in some capacity, he volunteered as an ambulance driver for the French Army. In 1926, Jerome published his autobiography, My Life and Times. Shortly afterwards, the Borough of Walsall conferred on him the title Freeman of the Borough. During these last years, Jerome spent more time at his farmhouse Gould's Grove south-east of Ewelme near Wallingford.

Jerome suffered a paralytic stroke and a cerebral haemorrhage in June 1927, on a motoring tour from Devon to London via Cheltenham and Northampton. He lay in Northampton General Hospital for two weeks before dying on 14 June.  He was cremated at Golders Green Crematorium and his ashes buried at St Mary's Church, Ewelme, Oxfordshire. Elsie, Ettie and his sister Blandina are buried beside him. His gravestone reads "For we are labourers together with God".  A small museum dedicated to his life and works was opened in 1984 at his birth home in Walsall, but it closed in 2008 and the contents were returned to Walsall Museum.

Legacy 
 Lazy Thoughts of a Lazy Girl, a book by the pseudonymous "Jenny Wren", was published in 1891. The author is anonymous. The book has the same form as Idle Thoughts of an Idle Fellow but is from the point of view of a woman.
 Science-fiction author Connie Willis credited Jerome as the source for the title of her novel To Say Nothing of the Dog, this being the subtitle of Three Men in a Boat.
 There is a French graphic novel series named  after the author.
 From 1984 to 2008, there was a museum honouring him in Walsall, his birthplace.
 A sculpture of a boat and a mosaic of a dog commemorate his book Three Men in a Boat on the Millennium Green in New Southgate, London, where he lived as a child.
 There is an English Heritage blue plaque which reads 'Jerome K. Jerome 1859–1927 Author Wrote 'Three Men in a Boat' while living here at flat 104' at 104 Chelsea Gardens, Chelsea Bridge Road, London, United Kingdom. It was erected in 1989.
 There is a beer company named Cerveza Jerome in Mendoza, Argentina. Its founder was a fan of Three Men in a Boat.
 A building at Walsall Campus, University of Wolverhampton is named after him.
 British Rail named one of its Class 31 diesel locomotives after him on the 6th May 1990 at Bescot.

Bibliography 

 Novels

 Three Men in a Boat (To Say Nothing of the Dog) (1889)
 Diary of a Pilgrimage (and Six Essays) (1891) (full text)
 Weeds: A Story in Seven Chapters (1892)
 Novel Notes (1893)
 Three Men on the Bummel (a.k.a. Three Men on Wheels) (1900)
 Paul Kelver, a novel (1902)
 Tea-table Talk (1903)
 Tommy and Co (1904)
 They and I (1909)
 All Roads Lead to Calvary (1919)
 Anthony John (1923)

 Collections

 Idle Thoughts of an Idle Fellow (1886)
 Told After Supper (1891)
 John Ingerfield: And Other Stories (1894)
 Sketches in Lavender, Blue, and Green (1895)
 Second Thoughts of an Idle Fellow (1898)
 The Observations of Henry (1901)
 The Angel and the Author – and Others (1904) (20 essays)
 American Wives – and Others (1904) (25 essays, comprising 5 from The Angel and the Author, and 20 from Idle Ideas in 1905).
 Idle Ideas in 1905 (1905)
 The Passing of the Third Floor Back: And Other Stories (1907)
 Malvina of Brittany (1916)
 A miscellany of sense and nonsense from the writings of Jerome K. Jerome. Selected by the author with many apologies, with forty-three illustrations by Will Owen. 1924
 Three Men in a Boat and Three Men on the Bummel (1974)
 After Supper Ghost Stories: And Other Tales (1985)
 A Bicycle in Good Repair

 Autobiography
On the Stage—and Off (1885)
 My Life and Times (1926)

 Anthologies containing stories by Jerome K. Jerome

 Great Short Stories of Detection, Mystery and Horror 1st Series (1928)
 A Century of Humour (1934)
 The Mammoth Book of Thrillers, Ghosts and Mysteries (1936)
 Alfred Hitchcock Presents (1957)
 Famous Monster Tales (1967)
 The 5th Fontana Book of Great Ghost Stories (1969)
 The Rivals of Frankenstein (1975)
 The 17th Fontana Book of Great Ghost Stories (1981)
 Stories in the Dark (1984)
 Gaslit Nightmares (1988)
 Horror Stories (1988)
 100 Tiny Tales of Terror (1996)
 Knights of Madness: Further Comic Tales of Fantasy (1998)
 100 Hilarious Little Howlers (1999)

 Short stories

 The Haunted Mill (1891)
 The New Utopia (1891)
 The Dancing Partner (1893)
 Evergreens
 Christmas Eve in the Blue Chamber
 Silhouettes
 The Skeleton
 The Snake
 The Woman of the Saeter
 The Philosopher's Joke (1909)
 The Love of Ulrich Nebendahl (1909)

 Plays

 Pity is Akin to Love (1888)
 New Lamps for Old (1890)
 The Maister of Wood Barrow: play in three acts (1890)
 What Women Will Do (1890)
 Birth and Breeding (1890) – based on Die Ehre, produced in New York in 1895 as "Honour"
 The Rise of Dick Halward (1895), produced in New York the previous year as "The Way to Win a Woman"
 "The Prude's Progress" (1895) co-written with Eden Phillpotts
 The MacHaggis (1897)
 John Ingerfield (1899)
 The Night of 14 Feb.. 1899: a play in nine scenes
 Miss Hobbs: a comedy in four acts (1902) – starring Evelyn Millard
 Tommy (1906)
 Sylvia of the Letters (1907)
 Fanny and the Servant Problem, a quite possible play in four acts (1909)
 The Master of Mrs. Chilvers: an improbable comedy, imagined by Jerome K. Jerome (1911)
 Esther Castways (1913)
 The Great Gamble (1914)
 The Three Patriots (1915)
 The Soul Of Nicholas Snyders : A Mystery Play in Three Acts (1925)
 The Celebrity: a play in three acts  (1926)
 Robina's Web ("The Dovecote", or "The grey feather"): a farce in four acts
 The Passing of the Third Floor Back (1908) (the basis of a 1918 film and a 1935 film)
 The Night of Feb. 14th 1899 – never produced
 A Russian Vagabond – ''never produced

See also
 List of ambulance drivers during World War I
 List of people with reduplicated names
 We (novel) – author Zamyatin inspired by Jerome's work

References

External links 

 
 
 
 
 
 
 
 The Jerome K. Jerome Society
 Jerome K. Jerome Short Stories
 http://www.jeromekjerome.com/bibliography/unpublished-plays-by-jerome/
 Jerome K. Jerome Quotes subject-wise
 Below the Fairy City: A Life of Jerome K. Jerome by Carolyn W. de la L. Oulton
 Jerome K. Jerome in 1881
 
 Philip de László's portrait of Jerome K. Jerome
 Plays by Jerome K. Jerome on the Great War Theatre website
 A Humorist's Plea for Serious Reading from The Literary Digest, January 13, 1906

1859 births
1927 deaths
19th-century English dramatists and playwrights
19th-century English male writers
19th-century English non-fiction writers
19th-century English novelists
19th-century essayists
19th-century short story writers
19th-century travel writers
20th-century English dramatists and playwrights
20th-century English male writers
20th-century English non-fiction writers
20th-century English novelists
20th-century essayists
20th-century short story writers
20th-century travel writers
Burials in Oxfordshire
Cycling writers
English autobiographers
English critics
English essayists
English horror writers
English humorists
English male dramatists and playwrights
English male novelists
English male short story writers
English non-fiction writers
English satirists
English travel writers
French military personnel of World War I
Ghost story writers
Humor researchers
People educated at St Marylebone Grammar School
People from Walsall